Michele Catherine Boyd is an American actress, producer and host. She co-founded the geek girl parody group Team Unicorn and played Riley in the popular webseries The Guild.

Early life and education
Boyd was born to a Navy family and thus spent much of her life traveling. She lived all over the United States as well as Italy and Japan before going to high school in San Diego. She was involved in school musicals from a very early age up through high school, performing in everything from The King and I to Cats. Boyd was a competitive swimmer since the age of 6, eventually competing in the California Interscholastic Federation Swimming and Diving events. Boyd also has worked as a snowboarding instructor and holds a green belt in hapkido.

She received her Bachelor of Science degree in Neurobiology, Physiology and Behavior from the University of California, Davis, and before settling into her career as an actress, she studied behavior at Harvard Medical School.

Career
After receiving her bachelor's degree, Boyd modeled in New York City before moving to Los Angeles and quickly landing roles on the television shows Sons of Anarchy, The Young and the Restless, and How I Met Your Mother. She utilized her science background cohosting the show Machines of Malice as a neuroscience consultant for the Discovery Channel. Boyd is also a Nickelodeon show favorite, guest starring on the shows iCarly, True Jackson, VP and Big Time Rush.

In 2009, Boyd appeared on 14 episodes of the popular web series The Guild. In 2010, Boyd co-created the geek girl group Team Unicorn. Their first music video was "G33k & G4m3r Girls", a parody of Katy Perry's "California Gurls"; it achieved over one million views in its first week. In 2013, Adult Swim announced they would be producing a Team Unicorn television pilot.

She cohosted the series Game Changers, a Top Gear-influenced show testing out video game tropes such as jet packs, parkour and lockpicking in the real world. She has also modeled for the J!NX gamers clothing line and was named one of GeekWeek.com's "10 Hottest Geek Girls". Boyd was also referenced in Diablo III from Blizzard Entertainment as a rare unicorn character named "Miss Hell" alongside other Team Unicorn members. She starred in Geek Cred, an office comedy set in a comic book store.

Her feature film Bar America, directed by Matthew Jacobs, premiered at the Santa Catalina Film Festival in 2014.

Currently Boyd is the cohost of Watching Thrones, a live Game of Thrones recap/discussion show. Watching Thrones airs on Screen Junkies, an Emmy-nominated online movie magazine and YouTube channel with over six million subscribers and over 1.6 billion views.

In 2018, she became part of the reboot S.W.A.T. with Shemar Moore. She plays the character Valerie Rocker.

Filmography

Television

Film

Internet Series

Awards and nominations

References

External links
 Michele Boyd Online – official website and blog
 

American film actresses
American television actresses
Living people
1980 births
American hapkido practitioners
University of California, Davis alumni
People from Alachua, Florida
21st-century American women